Midtbyen is the Danish and Norwegian word for a city or town centre. The name is often used to refer to specific areas in a city.

Midtbyen may refer to:

Midtbyen, Aarhus, the city centre of the city of Aarhus in Denmark
Midtbyen, Bodø, a borough in the city of Bodø in Nordland county, Norway
Midtbyen, Kongsvinger, a borough in the city of Kongsvinger in Hedmark county, Norway
Midtbyen, Trondheim, a borough in the city of Trondheim in Trøndelag county, Norway